Sucre Municipality is one of the 21 municipalities (municipios) that makes up the Venezuelan state of Miranda and one of five the municipalities that make up the Metropolitan District of Caracas. According to a 2016 population estimate by the National Institute of Statistics of Venezuela, the municipality has a population of 691,317.  The parish of Petare is the municipal seat of the Sucre Municipality.

Name
The municipality is one of several in Venezuela named "Sucre Municipality" in honour of Venezuelan independence hero Antonio José de Sucre.

Demographics
The Sucre Municipality, according to a 2016 population estimate by the National Institute of Statistics of Venezuela, has a population of 691,317 (up from 591,414 in 2000).  This amounts to 2.2% of the state's population.  The municipality's population density  (2016) is about 11,000 people per square mile (4,200/km²).

Government

Mayors

Education

Colegio Japonés de Caracas (カラカス日本人学校), the sole Japanese international school in Venezuela, is in Sucre Municipality.

References

External links
www.alcaldias.gob.ve/portal-alcaldias/municipiosc.html?id_estado=13&id_municipio=9 

Municipalities of Miranda (state)